Statewide primary elections in the Commonwealth of Pennsylvania were held on May 20, 2003. Pennsylvania's general elections for various state offices and ballot proposals were then held November 4, 2003.

Justice of the Supreme Court

Judge of the Superior Court

Ballot questions

References

 
Pennsylvania